The 2009 Erie RiverRats season was the third season for the American Indoor Football Association (AIFA) franchise.

In August, 2008, Liotta resigned as coach of the RiverRats and left to coach the Wheeling Wildcats. In September 2008, the RiverRats named Steven G. Folmar as the franchise's second head coach. In December 2008, owner Jeff Hauser sold the team to a group of local businessmen, headed by Jeff Plyler, Bob Foltyn and Frank Herman. The RiverRats had to replace many players on the roster, as most of the 2008 roster followed Liotta to Wheeling. As a result of all the changes, the RiverRats struggled all season to score points, resulting in offensive coordinator Paul Pennington's resignation after an 0–3 start. After dropping to 0–7, the RiverRats got their first win of the season on a last second field goal by Joe Lindway. The RiverRats ended up finishing with a 3-11 record, and missing the playoffs for the first time in franchise history.

Schedule

Regular season

Standings

 Green indicates clinched playoff berth
 Purple indicates division champion
 Grey indicates best league record

References

Erie Explosion seasons
2009 in sports in Pennsylvania